Jeremy Fernandes (born 14 August 1995) is a Dutch football player of Cape Verdean descent who plays for Derde Divisie club SteDoCo.

Club career
He made his professional debut in the Eerste Divisie for FC Den Bosch on 21 August 2015 in a game against FC Emmen.

Fernandes signed for FK Jelgava in Latvia two weeks after his contract with Den Bosch was terminated.

References

External links
 
 

1995 births
Living people
Dutch sportspeople of Cape Verdean descent
Footballers from Rotterdam
Association football defenders
Dutch footballers
FC Den Bosch players
FK Jelgava players
Eerste Divisie players
Latvian Higher League players